Platysticta is a genus of shadowdamsel in the damselfly family Platystictidae. There are about nine described species in Platysticta.

Species
These nine species belong to the genus Platysticta:
 Platysticta apicalis Kirby, 1893
 Platysticta digna Hagen, 1860
 Platysticta hilaris Hagen, 1860
 Platysticta maculata Hagen in Selys, 1860
 Platysticta montana Hagen, 1860
 Platysticta quadrata Selys-Longchamps, 1860
 Platysticta secreta Bedjanic & van Tol, 2016
 Platysticta serendibica Bedjanic & van Tol, 2016
 Platysticta tropica Hagen, 1860

References

Further reading

 
 
 

Platystictidae
Articles created by Qbugbot